Lena Lattwein (born 2 May 2000) is a German footballer who plays as a midfielder for Frauen-Bundesliga club VfL Wolfsburg and the Germany national team.

Club career
Lattwein played football for youth teams of JFG Untere III. She then played for 1. FC Saarbrücken, making her debut in February 2017. With Saarbrücken, she appeared in 10 matches, scoring 6 goals.

In June 2017, she signed with Frauen-Bundesliga club TSG 1899 Hoffenheim. Lattwein made her Bundesliga debut on 2 September 2017, starting in Hoffenheim's first match of the season, a 0–6 defeat to VfL Wolfsburg. She scored her first Bundesliga goal on 15 October 2017 in a 3–0 win against 1. FC Köln. In September 2018, Lattwein extended her contract with Hoffenheim through 2020.

Lattwein signed to join VfL Wolfsburg in 2021.

International career
Lattwein represented Germany at the under-15 and under-16 levels. On 30 October 2013, she made her debut for the Germany under-15 team in a 6–0 win against Scotland, scoring two goals. In February 2016, she captained the Germany under-16 team in the UEFA Development Tournament against the Netherlands, Scotland, and France.

In October 2018, Lattwein received her first call up to the Germany senior team, following an injury to Lena Petermann, for Germany's friendly match against Austria; Lattwein did not appear in the match.

On 10 November 2018, made her debut for the Germany senior team in a 5–2 win against Italy.

Personal life
Lattwein studied mathematical economics at the University of Mannheim.

Career statistics

Scores and results list Germany's goal tally first, score column indicates score after each Lattwein goal.

Honours
Germany
 UEFA Women's Championship runner-up: 2022

References

External links

2000 births
Living people
German women's footballers
Germany women's international footballers
People from Neunkirchen (German district)
1. FC Saarbrücken (women) players
TSG 1899 Hoffenheim (women) players
Women's association football midfielders
Footballers from Saarland
UEFA Women's Euro 2022 players
VfL Wolfsburg (women) players
Frauen-Bundesliga players